Abduallah Hussein Alkorshomi was the Prime Minister of the Yemen Arab Republic from 2 September 1969 until 5 February 1970.  He served under President Abdul Rahman al-Iryani.

He was born in 1932 in the village of Bayt Baws in Bani Matar District in Sanaa Governorate. He died July 26, 2007, and was buried in the Bayt Baws Graveyard.

References 
 "Former prime minister and roads guru mourned", by Zaid al-Alaya’a, Jul 31, 2007, Yemen Observer. Retrieved April 15, 2010.

Prime Ministers of North Yemen
1932 births
2007 deaths
20th-century Yemeni politicians
Attas Cabinet